Live at the Enmore Theatre (2007) is a single DVD by Canadian singer/songwriter Jeff Martin and the Toronto Tabla Ensemble. Like the Live in Brisbane 2006 album, the performance was recorded during Martin's September tour of Australia. The DVD features an entire performance, as well as bonus material including an interview with Martin and Ritesh Das; backstage footage; scenes from soundcheck and an instore appearance; and a marriage proposal by a fan to another on stage.

Track listing
"Silence" (The Tea Party cover)
"Psychopomp" (The Tea Party)
"Requiem" (The Tea Party)
"Daystar"
"Shadows on the Mountainside" (The Tea Party)
"The Badger" (The Tea Party)
"I Love you" (Daniel Lanois cover)
"The Messenger" (Daniel Lanois)
"Inanna" (The Tea Party)
"White Water Siren" (The Tea Party)
"Lament"
"Black Snake Blues"
"The Bazaar" (The Tea Party)
"Oceans" (The Tea Party)
"The Kingdom"
"Sister Awake" (The Tea Party)
"Winter Solstice" (The Tea Party)
"Save Me" (The Tea Party)

Personnel 
Jeff Martin – vocals, six and twelve string acoustic guitars, Gibson harp guitar, hurdy-gurdy, sarod, Ellis seven-string resonator guitar, oud, esraj
Ritesh Das – Indian percussion, goblet drums, dhol, tabla
Ian de Souza – bass guitar
Joanna De Souza – keyboard, kathak dancing
Anita Katakkar – tabla
Heather Thorkelson – tabla
Rob Sawyer – six string acoustic guitar

Charts

References

External links
Jeff Martin's website
The Toronto Tabla Ensemble's website

Jeff Martin (Canadian musician) video albums
2007 video albums
2007 live albums
Live video albums
Concert films